Raymond Huguet (8 February 1938 – 21 September 2022) was a French professional cyclist. He raced professionally from 1961 to 1963 and competed in the 1961 Giro d'Italia.

Awards
 (1964)

References

External links

1938 births
2022 deaths
French male cyclists
Sportspeople from Loir-et-Cher